Grand Rapids Theological Seminary (GRTS) of Cornerstone University is a private interdenominational evangelical Christian seminary located in Grand Rapids, Michigan.  GRTS is an accredited member of the Association of Theological Schools in the United States and Canada, The Higher Learning Commission of the North Central Association of Colleges and Schools, and is authorized by the Michigan State Board of Education to grant advanced theological degrees.

History

Grand Rapids Theological Seminary had its beginnings as an evening Bible institute at Wealthy Street Baptist Church in 1941.  David Otis Fuller who was elected pastor of Wealthy Street Baptist Church on November 4, 1934; became one of the founders of cornerstone university and grand rapids theological seminary. David Fuller organized a meeting of the committee of the Organization of the Baptist Bible Institute in October 1940. January 1941 the school was organized with ten part time instructors and David Otis Fuller serving as President of the Executive Council. David Fuller was a popular evangelist with his program being featured on 600 radio stations globally. The Bible institute became a degree granting institution in 1963 and moved to its present location in 1964. Grand Rapids Bible College and Seminary which were precursors to Cornerstone University and Grand Rapids Theological Seminary were bastions of conservative fundamentalism due to David O Fuller vision to parallel the institutions to align with conservative wealthy street Baptist church. The institution became a Christian liberal arts college in 1972 and became a state-approved university in 1999.  Today Cornerstone University and Grand Rapids Theological Seminary share a  campus four miles (6 km) east of downtown Grand Rapids, Michigan.  The campus currently supports the undergraduate college, with programs for traditional students as well as accelerated degree programs, graduate programs including Grand Rapids Theological Seminary and Asia Baptist Theological Seminary based in Thailand, and Cornerstone University Radio (WCSG and Mission Network News).

Grand Rapids Theological Seminary exists primarily to advance biblical knowledge and ministry skill, to encourage the development of critical thinking and worldview formation, to nurture a global ministry perspective, and to enhance culturally relevant ministry.

Degree programs

Grand Rapids Theological Seminary offers a Master of Divinity degree, along with 4 Master of Arts programs, and 2 Master of Theology programs both residentially and online.

Faculty
Royce A. Evans, B.A., M.A., D.Min. (Pastoral Ministry)
Kenneth Reid, B.S., Th.M, Th.M., Ph.D. (Systematic & Historical Theology) 
Michael E. Wittmer, B.A., M.Div., Th.M., Ph.D.  (Systematic & Historical Theology)
Daniel Watson, B.A., M.Phil., Th.M., Ph.D. (Biblical Studies: Old Testament)
Bruce Henning, B.S., M.Div., Ph.D. (Biblical Studies: New Testament)

Emeritus Faculty
Byard Bennett, B.A., M.Div., Ph.D. (Systematic & Historical Theology)
Gary T. Meadors, Th.B., M.Div.,Th.M., Th.D. (Biblical Studies: New Testament)
David B. Kennedy, B.A., Th.M. (Biblical Studies: Old Testament)
David Turner, B.A., M.Div., Th.M., Th.D., M.Phil., Ph.D. (Biblical Studies: New Testament)
John I. Lawlor, B.A., B.D., Th.M., M.Phil., Ph.D. (Biblical Studies: Old Testament)

Faculty Publications
Michael Wittmer, Heaven is a place on earth: Why everything you do matters to God. Zondervan, 2004. 
Michael Wittmer, Don't stop believing: Why living like Jesus is not enough. Zondervan, 2008. 
Michael Wittmer, The last enemy: Preparing to win the fight of your life. Discovery House, 2012.
Michael Wittmer, Despite doubt: Embracing a confident faith. Discovery House, 2013.
Michael Wittmer, Becoming Worldly Saints: Can you serve Jesus and still enjoy your life? Zondervan, 2015.

References

External links
 Grand Rapids Theological Seminary

Seminaries and theological colleges in Michigan
Education in Grand Rapids, Michigan
Religion in Grand Rapids, Michigan
Educational institutions established in 1948
Universities and colleges in Kent County, Michigan
1948 establishments in Michigan